The Cary State Forest is in the U.S. state of Florida. The 13,385-acre (5,417 ha) forest is located in the northeast in Bryceville, Florida, a community between Baldwin and Callahan northwest of Jacksonville. It was established as the second State Forest of Florida, in 1937.

The main tract of the forest (Cary Tract) is located along the east side of US 301 between Bryceville and Ingle, Behind this tract is the Monticello Tract, which is almost entirely in Duval County, and southeast of this is the Norfolk Southern Tract, the southern portion of which is bisected by the Jacksonville-Baldwin Rail Trail. Much further north of these is the Thomas Creek Tract south of Crawford, most of which is in Nassau County, except for one-fourth of the eastern section.

See also
List of Florida state forests
List of Florida state parks
Jacksonville-Baldwin Rail Trail

References

External links
  Cary State Forest: Florida Forest Service - FDACS

Florida state forests
Protected areas of Duval County, Florida
Protected areas of Nassau County, Florida